Magas (Greek Mάγας; 241 BC - 221 BC) was a grandson of Magas of Cyrene, being a son of Ptolemy Euergetes (246–221 BC) and Berenice. He was put to death by his brother Ptolemy Philopator (221–204 BC), soon after the accession of the latter, at the instigation of Sosibius.

Ancestry

References
Smith, William (editor); Dictionary of Greek and Roman Biography and Mythology, "Magas (2)", Boston, (1867)

Notes

3rd-century BC Egyptian people
3rd-century BC deaths
3rd-century BC Greek people
Year of birth unknown
Ptolemaic dynasty